Richard Tormen (born 10 October 1951) is a Chilean former cyclist. He competed in the sprint and 1000m time trial events at the 1976 Summer Olympics.

References

External links
 

1951 births
Living people
Chilean male cyclists
Olympic cyclists of Chile
Cyclists at the 1976 Summer Olympics
Place of birth missing (living people)
Pan American Games medalists in cycling
Pan American Games gold medalists for Chile
Pan American Games bronze medalists for Chile
Cyclists at the 1979 Pan American Games
Medalists at the 1979 Pan American Games
20th-century Chilean people
21st-century Chilean people